HMS St Austell Bay was a  anti-aircraft frigate of the British Royal Navy, named after St Austell Bay on the south coast of Cornwall. In commission from 1945 until 1956, she served in the Mediterranean Fleet and on the America and West Indies Squadron.

Construction
The ship was originally ordered from Harland and Wolff of Belfast on 2 February 1943 as the  Loch Lydoch. However the contract was then changed, and the ship was built to a revised design as a Bay-class anti-aircraft frigate, launched on 18 November 1944, and completed on 29 May 1945.

Service history
After commissioning and sea trials St Austell Bay was assigned to duty in the British Pacific Fleet. However, she was still at Malta with other ships of the 33rd Escort Group when news of the surrender of Japan arrived on 15 August. St Austell Bay remained in the Mediterranean Sea for the next five years, mainly operating in the Aegean and Adriatic, on patrols, guardship duties, and several periods as part of the Haifa Patrol, attempting to intercept ships carrying illegal Jewish immigrants to Palestine.

In March she returned to the UK for service in the 7th Frigate Flotilla, Home Fleet, and almost immediately took part on the search for the missing submarine . Patrols, visits, and fleet exercises occupied the rest of the year, including an exercise with a submarine of the Royal Norwegian Navy in September.

In June 1952 she arrived at Hamilton, Bermuda, to join the America and West Indies Squadron, and in July was sent to Port Stanley to act as Guardship in the Falkland Islands. In October she left the Falklands and sailed up the west coast of South America, making calls at Puerto Montt, Valparaíso and Antofagasta in Chile, and Callao in Peru, before transiting the Panama Canal, and returning to Bermuda in December.

In 1953 she visited various Caribbean ports, and carried out exercises, including one in May with ships of the Royal Canadian Navy. In June she sailed to Devonport to refit, then returned to Bermuda in November. From March to June 1954 she was Guardship at the Falklands, again returning to Bermuda by way of the Pacific coast of South America. In September she visited the United States, calling at ports in New England, then returned to the UK in November to refit at Plymouth.

St Austell Bay was recommissioned in May 1955, but significant problems with the refit delayed deployment until November when she returned to Bermuda for the usual programme of joint exercises, training and port visits in the Caribbean and to North America. She returned to Plymouth in August 1956 to decommission and was put into Reserve. St Austell Bay remained in the Reserve Fleet at Plymouth until 1959 when she was placed on the Disposal List. She was sold to BISCO for demolition by Shipbreaking Industries and arrived in tow at the breakers yard at Charlestown near Rosyth on 5 July 1959.

References

Publications

 

1944 ships
Bay-class frigates
Ships built in Belfast
Ships built by Harland and Wolff